Kang cancer is a form of squamous-celled carcinoma associated with sleeping on the traditional kang heated-brick bed of Tibet and Northern China. The kang bed is a hollow brick platform warmed by an internal coal, charcoal, or dung fire. Kang cancer often develops in previous burn scar tissue, indicating that smoke carcinogens may not play a role.

See also 
 Kangri ulcer
 Kairo cancer
 List of cutaneous conditions

References 

Skin conditions resulting from physical factors